The Tangye Baronetcy, of Glendorgal in the parish of St Columb Minor in the County of Cornwall, was a title in the Baronetage of the United Kingdom. It was created on 10 July 1912 for the industrialist Harold Tangye. He was the eldest son of the manufacturer Sir Richard Tangye. The title became extinct on the death of the second Baronet in 1969. Derek and Nigel Tangye were the nephews of the first Baronet.

Tangye baronetcy, of Glendorgal (1912)
 Sir , 1st Baronet (1866–1935)
 Sir , 2nd Baronet (1895–1969)

See also
 Tangye

References

Extinct baronetcies in the Baronetage of the United Kingdom